Mariya Mikhailovna Koroteyeva (born 10 November 1981) is a Russian athlete who specializes in the 100 metres hurdles.

Her personal best time is 12.60 seconds, achieved during the Olympic Games in Athens.

International competitions

References

1981 births
Living people
People from Kashira
Sportspeople from Moscow Oblast
Russian female hurdlers
Olympic female hurdlers
Olympic athletes of Russia
Athletes (track and field) at the 2004 Summer Olympics
Russian Athletics Championships winners